David Beers Quinn (24 April 1909 – 19 March 2002) was an Irish historian who wrote extensively on the voyages of discovery and colonisation of America. Many of his publications appeared as volumes of the Hakluyt Society. He played a major role in assisting the presentation of the historical aspects during the quadricentennial celebrations (1984–1987) of the first establishment of a colony at Roanoke Island.

Quinn was born in Dublin, Ireland and was the single pupil at his first school. He graduated from Queen's University, Belfast in 1931. He then completed a PhD on the early Tudor administration in Ireland at King's College London. He subsequently spent five years as a lecturer at University College, Southampton (now Southampton University). Returning to Belfast in 1939, he taught Irish history.

He became interested in the voyages of discovery made by Humphrey Gilbert. At that time historians relied uncritically on the works of Richard Hakluyt published around 1600. Quinn's work and the new sources he discovered resulted in his first volume for the Hakluyt Society, and marked the beginning of his seminal work on voyages of exploration, which he developed from 1944 at University College, Swansea. In 1957 he moved to Liverpool University.

At the instigation of America's Four Hundredth Anniversary Committee his Set Fair for Roanoke: Voyages and Colonies, 1584–1590 was published by University of North Carolina Press in 1985.

He died in Liverpool, England on 19 March 2002.

References
Brief Obituary
David Beers Quinn, the Roanoke Voyages, and North Carolina
Biography of the first Fellow of the Society for the History of Discoveries, 2001
   Register of the David B. Quinn Papers in the Library of Congress.
  Hakluyt Society Tributes to David Quinn

Historians from Northern Ireland
Alumni of Queen's University Belfast
Alumni of King's College London
Academics of the University of Southampton
1909 births
2002 deaths
20th-century Irish historians
Male non-fiction writers from Northern Ireland
20th-century British male writers
Honorary Fellows of the British Academy